Kevin Lauderdale is an American science fiction author primarily known for his Star Trek short stories, which began with publication in the Strange New Worlds anthology series.  His stories appeared in three successive volumes of the series, making him eligible for a "Wardy," named for fellow Strange New Worlds veteran Dayton Ward.

In addition to his Star Trek work, he has published essays and articles in The Dictionary of American Biography (now known as The Scribner Encyclopedia of American Lives), the Los Angeles Times, Bride Again, Animato!, Pulse!, and McSweeney's Internet Tendency, as well as poetry in Andrei Codrescu's Exquisite Corpse.

He was formerly the writer of "The Kevindex", a book review website, from 1996 to 2001.  That site is now down, and only one piece of content is still available online in archived form: "An Annotated Guide to The Two Georges by Richard Dreyfuss and Harry Turtledove."

Lauderdale holds a bachelor's degree in English literature from UCLA and a master's degree in the same field from San Francisco State University, as well as a Master of Library and Information Science degree (also from UCLA).  He currently lives in northern Virginia with his wife, two daughters, and two dogs.

Bibliography

Star Trek fiction

 Strange New Worlds VII (June 2004)
 "A Test of Character"
 Strange New Worlds 8 (July 2005)
 "Assignment: One"
 Strange New Worlds 9 (August 2006)
 "The Rules of War"
 Star Trek: Constellations (September 2006)
 "Devices and Desires"
 Outside In Boldly Goes (ATB Publishing, November 2016)
 "Minutes of the Ruling Council of Elysia" (The Star Trek: The Animated Series episode "The Time Trap" considered as an episode of The Vicar of Dibley).

Original fiction
"The Skinhead and the Cavalier", Tales from the Canyons of the Damned, No. 36, ed by Daniel Arthur Smith, December 2019.
"Yard Work", Poets/Artists, “Chronicles of a Future Foretold”, Curated by Dr. Samuel Peralta, August 2018.
 The story was reprinted by  Little Blue Marble, September 2022.
"James and the Great Pumpkin (Carving Contest)", Tales from the Canyons of the Damned, No. 19, ed. by Daniel Arthur Smith, September 2017.
"A Personal Account of the Battle of the Eurydice and the Sceptre", Tales from the Canyons of the Damned,  No. 18, ed. by Daniel Arthur Smith, August 2017.
"The Peacemaker", Tales from the Canyons of the Damned in Space, No. 1, ed by Daniel Arthur Smith, December 2016.
"Box 27", Nature. 539, 17 November 2016.  A story inspired by Carl Sagan's Cosmos: A Personal Voyage
"Air and Space After Dark", (co-written with Jeff Ayers) Young Adventurers: Heroes, Explorers & Swashbucklers, ed. Austin S. Camacho,  Intrigue Publishing (December 2015)
"Olaf and Lars", A Quiet Shelter There:  An Anthology to Benefit Homeless Animals, ed. Gerri Leen, Hadley Rille Books (October 2015)
 The story was reprinted in the web site Cosmic Roots And Eldritch Shores, January 2018.
 The story was reprinted in the anthology Paradoxical Pets, ed. James Maxey, Word Balloon Books,  November 2022.
"James and the Prince of Darkness", Ain't Superstitious, ed. Juliana Rew, Third Flatiron Press (August 2015)
"The Flatboat", Lissette's Tales of the Imagination, issue 6.  June 2013
"Man on the Moon," Daily Flash 2012: 366 Days of Flash Fiction, ed. Jessy Marie Roberts, Pill Hill Press (2011)
"America's! Next!! Zombie!!!", Zombies Ain't Funny, ed. Greg Crites, Veinarmor (June 2011)
"James and the Gentry", Twit Publishing Presents: PULP!: Summer/Fall 2011 (Volume 3), ed. Chris Gabrysch, Twit Publishing (June 2011)
 The story was reprinted in  Tales from the Canyons of the Damned,  No. 13, ed by Daniel Arthur Smith, February 2017.
"James and the Dark Grimoire", Cthulhu Unbound, ed. John Sunseri and Thom Brannan, Permuted Press (March 2009).
 This story was released as a full-cast audio drama on episode 93 of The Chronic Rift podcast on August 5, 2010.
 In August 2010 the story was nominated for the WSFA Small Press Award by the Washington Science Fiction Association.
 This story made Ellen Datlow's honorable mention list for Best Horror published in 2009.
 The story was reprinted in  Tales from the Canyons of the Damned,  No. 6, ed by Daniel Arthur Smith, July 2016.
"The Laughing C'rell", Neo-Opsis, issue 15.  September 2008.

Non-fiction
"'Penny Lane' by the Beatles," McSweeneys Internet Tendency:  Short Essays on Favorite Songs, Inspired by Nick Hornby's Songbook, (May 23, 2005)

 "Vincent Price," Scribner Encyclopedia of American Lives. Volume 3 (Jackson, Markoe, and Markoe, eds), New York: Charles Scribner's Sons, 2001.
"Mel Blanc," Scribner Encyclopedia of American Lives. Volume 2 (Jackson, Markoe, and Markoe, eds), New York: Charles Scribner's Sons, 1999.
"A Few New Year's Treat for the VCR," Los Angeles Times, January 2, 1997.
"Rating the Disney Classics : The Best--and the Rest--of Animated Videos, on a Scale From 1 to 10," Los Angeles Times, July 5, 1996.
"When the Small Screen Makes It Larger Than Life," Los Angeles Times, June 2, 1996.
"James M. Cain," Dictionary of American Biography. Supplement 10 (Jackson, Markoe, and Markoe, eds), New York: Simon & Schuster Macmillan, 1995.
"Capra-free Xmas," Tower Records' Pulse! magazine (December 1994)
"Star Trek:  The Animated Series:  A Second Look,"Animato! magazine (Summer 1994)

Podcasts
Lauderdale hosted a monthly pop culture podcast on The Chronic Rift network titled “It Has Come to My Attention.”  He now hosts a podcast devoted to the Golden Age of Radio called "Presenting the Transcription Feature" and co-hosts a bad movie podcast, "Mighty Movie's Temple of Bad."

Podcasts:
 Crockett Johnson's 1940s comic strip Barnaby  June 2013
 Darl Larsen's annotated guide to Monty Python's Flying Circus January 2013
 Children's books for Christmas November 2012
 Children's books for Halloween October 2012
 The Malaysian cartoonist Lat  July 2012
The Beatles' animated film Yellow Submarine  June 2012
The many incarnations of Judge Dee, especially in Detective Dee and the Mystery of the Phantom Flame May 2012
Sit-com humor April 2012 
Isaac Asimov's autobiographies  March, 2012
The film version of The Rocketeer   February, 2012
The Mote in God’s Eye, the Aubrey-Maturin books of Patrick O’Brian, and Star Trek   January, 2012
Tintin  December, 2011
The Cinnamon Bear  November, 2011
Ray Bradbury  October, 2011
Tom Angleberger's Origami Yoda books   September, 2011
Patrick Rothfuss, author of the two volumes of The Kingkiller Chronicle series   August, 2011
Sherlock Holmes graphic novels   July, 2011
The film version of The Man Who Would Be King   June, 2011

References

External links
 
 Author's Blog
 Interview with Dayton Ward and Kevin Lauderdale on The Chronic Rift talking about their experiences writing.
 Audio Adaptation of "James and the Dark Grimoire" on The Chronic Rift.
 "Box 27" in Nature

American science fiction writers
American short story writers
University of California, Los Angeles alumni
San Francisco State University alumni
Cthulhu Mythos writers
Living people
Writers from Los Angeles
American male short story writers
American male novelists
Year of birth missing (living people)